The  is a Japanese Grade 1 flat horse race in Japan for three-year-old thoroughbred colts and fillies run over a distance of 2,000 metres (approximately  mile) at the Nakayama Racecourse, Funabashi, Chiba, in April.

It was first run in 1939 and is the Japanese equivalent of the English 2,000 Guineas. (Note that the original 2,000 Guineas is currently run at 1,609 metres, or one mile, about two furlongs shorter than the Satsuki Shō.)

Winners since 1990 

 The 2011 race took place at Tokyo Racecourse due to the 2011 Tohoku earthquake and tsunami.

Earlier winners 

 1939 - Rock Park
 1940 - World Mine
 1941 - St Lite
 1942 - Arbeit
 1943 - Dielec
 1944 - Kuri Yamato
 1945 - no race
 1946 - no race
 1947 - Tokitsukaze
 1948 - Hide Hikari
 1949 - Tosa Midori
 1950 - Kumono Hana
 1951 - Tokino Minoru
 1952 - Kurino Hana
 1953 - Bostonian
 1954 - Dainana Hoshu
 1955 - Kegon
 1956 - Hekiraku
 1957 - Kazuyoshi
 1958 - Taisei Hope
 1959 - Wildeal
 1960 - Kodama
 1961 - Shin Tsubame
 1962 - Yamano O
 1963 - Meizui
 1964 - Shinzan
 1965 - Chitose O
 1966 - Nihon Pillow Ace
 1967 - Ryuzuki
 1968 - Martis
 1969 - Wild More
 1970 - Tanino Moutiers
 1971 - Hikaru Imai
 1972 - Land Prince
 1973 - Haiseiko
 1974 - Kitano Kachidoki
 1975 - Kaburaya O
 1976 - Tosho Boy
 1977 - Hard Berge
 1978 - Fantast
 1979 - Bingo Garoo
 1980 - Hawaiian Image
 1981 - Katsu Top Ace
 1982 - Azuma Hunter
 1983 - Mr. C.B.
 1984 - Symboli Rudolf
 1985 - Miho Shinzan
 1986 - Dyna Cosmos
 1987 - Sakura Star O
 1988 - Yaeno Muteki
 1989 - Doctor Spurt

See also
 Horse racing in Japan
 List of Japanese flat horse races

References 
Racing Post: 

Horse races in Japan
Turf races in Japan
Flat horse races for three-year-olds